The Saturn Award for Best Syndicated/Cable Television Series was presented annually by the Academy of Science Fiction, Fantasy and Horror Films, honoring the best syndicated or cable television series. It was first introduced in 1996 and discontinued in 2015 when the Saturn Awards went through major changes in their television categories.

Battlestar Galactica, Breaking Bad, Stargate SG-1, and The Walking Dead hold the record of most wins in the category with three. Stargate SG-1 also had the most nominations with eleven.

Winners and nominees

The following is a list of award winners and nominees. The winners are listed in bold.

(NOTE: Year refers to year of eligibility. The actual ceremonies were held the following year.)

1990s

2000s

2010s

Most nominations
 11 nominations - Stargate SG-1 (consecutive)
 8 nominations - Dexter (consecutive)
 7 nominations - The Closer (consecutive)
 5 nominations:
 Battlestar Galactica (consecutive)
 Farscape (consecutive)
 Leverage (consecutive)
 The Outer Limits (consecutive)
 True Blood (consecutive)
 4 nominations:
 American Horror Story (consecutive)
 Andromeda (consecutive)
 Star Trek: Deep Space Nine (consecutive)
 3 nominations:
 Babylon 5 (consecutive)
 Breaking Bad (consecutive)
 Dead Like Me (consecutive)
 The Dead Zone (consecutive)
 The Walking Dead (consecutive)
 2 nominations:
 Continuum (consecutive)
 Eureka
 The 4400 (consecutive)
 The Invisible Man (consecutive)
 The Killing (consecutive)
 Kyle XY (consecutive)
 Nip/Tuck (consecutive)
 Stargate: Atlantis (consecutive)

Most wins
 3 wins:
 Battlestar Galactica (2 consecutive)
 Breaking Bad (consecutive)
 Farscape (consecutive)
 Stargate SG-1 (2 consecutive)
 The Walking Dead (consecutive)
 2 wins - The Outer Limits (consecutive)

See also
 Saturn Award for Best Action-Thriller Television Series
 Saturn Award for Best Animated Series or Film on Television
 Saturn Award for Best Fantasy Television Series
 Saturn Award for Best Horror Television Series
 Saturn Award for Best Network Television Series
 Saturn Award for Best Science Fiction Television Series

External links
 Official Site

Syndicated Cable Television Series

fr:Saturn Award de la meilleure série#Meilleure série diffusée sur le câble ou en syndication